In common law, a hue and cry is a process by which bystanders are summoned to assist in the apprehension of a criminal who has been witnessed in the act of committing a crime.

History
By the Statute of Winchester of 1285, 13 Edw. I statute 2. capitulum 4, it was provided that anyone, either a constable or a private citizen, who witnessed a crime shall make hue and cry, and that the hue and cry must be kept up against the fleeing criminal from town to town and from county to county, until the felon is apprehended and delivered to the sheriff. All able-bodied men, upon hearing the shouts, were obliged to assist in the pursuit of the criminal, which makes it comparable to the posse comitatus. It was moreover provided that "the whole hundred … shall be answerable" for the theft or robbery committed, in effect a form of collective punishment. Those who raised a hue and cry falsely were themselves guilty of a crime.

The oath of office for constables in Tennessee, USA specifically mentions that it is the duty of the constable to sound the hue and cry.

Etymology
It is possible that the term is an Anglicization via Anglo-French of the Latin , meaning "a horn and shouting". Other sources indicate that it has always been a somewhat redundant phrase meaning an outcry and cry, though such "redundancy" is a feature of the legal doublet. "Hue" appears to come from the Old French , which means "to shout", and "cry" from Old French  ("to cry").

Cultural references
From the late 18th century until 1839, Hue and Cry was a principal or variant title for the weekly newspaper, containing details of crimes and wanted people, that afterwards became better known as the Police Gazette.
 Hue and Cry: a newspaper advertisement that offered rewards for the recapture of slaves who had escaped their masters.

See also

 AMBER Alert
 Citizen's arrest
 
History of law enforcement in the United Kingdom
 Nightwalker statute
 Misprision#Negative misprision
 Posse comitatus

Notes

References

Further reading
 
 
 

Collective punishment
Common law
Legal history of England
Medieval English law
Metaphors
Vigilantism